Mohammad Khalid Akhtar, (born 1920 in Bahawalpur, died 2 February 2002), was an Urdu-language writer. His satirical novel Chakiwara Mein Visal from 1964 won the Adamjee Literary Award.

Bibliography
 Chakiwara main Visal (1964).
 Khoya Hoa Ufaq (A collection of stories, sketches, satirical essays, the winner of the Adamjee Award in 1967).
 Bees So Giyara (A novel published in 1950 and republished in 1999).
 Yatra (A travelogue published in 1990).
 Do Safar (A travelogue – 1984
 Chacha Abdul Baqi –  Stories (Satire) – 1985
 Makatib E Khizar
 Ibn-i-Jubair ka safar (A travelogue published in 1994)
 Laltain Aur Dosari Kahaniyan (Stories and a novella published in 1984)
A complete collection of his short stories, travelogues, and articles is being published by Oxford University Press.

Further reading
 Muhammad Khalid Akhtar's Collection of Stories By Rashid Ashraf
Khalid Sahab Has Run Away! Again by Musharraf Ali Farooqi | DAWN, 28 August 2011 

In August 2010, a PhD thesis was submitted to Allama Iqbal Open University, Islamabad, by Waheed Ur Rehman with the title Muhammad Khalid Akhtar Shakhsiat Wa Fun.

References

1920 births
2002 deaths
People from Rahim Yar Khan District
Pakistani writers
Punjabi people
Urdu-language novelists
Urdu-language travel writers
Pakistani translators
Urdu-language fiction writers
Urdu-language humorists
Writers from Karachi
20th-century translators
Recipients of the Adamjee Literary Award
Pakistani travel writers